The Argentine black and white tegu (Salvator merianae), also known as the Argentine giant tegu, the black and white tegu, or the huge tegu, is a species of lizard in the family Teiidae. The species is the largest of the "tegu lizards". It is an omnivorous species which inhabits the tropical rain forests, savannas and semi-deserts of eastern and central South America.

Tegus are sometimes kept as pets by humans. They are notable for their unusually high intelligence and can also be housebroken. Like other reptiles, tegus go into brumation in autumn when the temperature drops. They exhibit a high level of activity during their wakeful period of the year. They are the only known reptiles to be partly endothermic.

Tegus fill ecological niches similar to those of monitor lizards, but are only distantly related to them; the similarities are an example of convergent evolution.

Etymology
The Argentine black and white tegu is of the Order Squamata and Family Teiidae, which also includes racerunners and whiptails. There are nine total genera of tegu, though new taxonomic classifications change, with the Argentine black and white tegu being of the Salvator genus.  The specific name, merianae, is in honor of German-born naturalist Maria Sibylla Merian, a naturalist and artist who studied insects, plants, and reptiles from the 17th to the 18th centuries.

Description

As a hatchling, Salvator merianae has an emerald green color from the tip of its snout to midway down its neck, with black markings. The emerald green becomes black several months after shedding. As a young tegu, the tail is banded yellow and black; as it ages, the solid yellow bands nearest to the body change to areas of weak speckling. Fewer solid bands indicates an older animal. A tegu can drop a section of its tail as a distraction if attacked. The tail is also used as a weapon to swipe at an aggressor; even a half-hearted swipe can leave a bruise. 

Tegus are capable of running at high speeds and can run bipedally for short distances. They often use this method in territorial defense, with the mouth open and front legs held wide to look more threatening. 

Adult males are much larger than the females and can reach  in length at maturity.

They have beaded skin and stripes running down their bodies.

The skull is heavily built with a large facial process of the maxilla, a single premaxilla, paired nasals, a single frontal bone and two parietal bones separated by the sagittal suture. Biomechanical analyses suggest the posterior processes of the parietal might be important for dealing with torsional loads due to posterior biting on one side. In the large adults, the posterior teeth are larger and more rounded than the anterior teeth.

Sex
When a tegu reaches the age of 8 months, the beginning of their juvenile age, their sex can easily be determined visually; their vent at the base of the tail will bulge when it is a male and lie flat when it is a female. Breeders generally inform the buyer on the sex of the animal before the purchase. In adults, the main difference is in the jowls; adult males have substantially developed jowls (a result of hypertrophic lateral pterygoideus muscles), while females' jawlines are more streamlined.

Ecology

Distribution and habitat
As the name would suggest, this tegu is native to Argentina, but also to Brazil, Paraguay and Uruguay.

Salvator merianae (once known as Tupinambis merianae) aka the Argentine Black and White Tegu is a large reptile native to South America. There are significant populations of Argentine Black and White Tegus in the southern United States and the Brazilian coast. They are a consistently problematic invasive species in  Florida counties, most likely as a result of escaped or released species from the early 2000s pet trade. Previous studies have found that the differing weather and climate patterns far outside of their natural habitat range do not prevent adult Argentine Black and White Tegus from surviving in diverse areas across the United States, furthering concerns about their invasive status. In the wild, tegus habitat both forested and open plain environments, widening their potential invasive range.

Tegus have also been found in scrub and wet habitats such as flooded savannas, canals, ponds, and streams. They largely seem indiscriminate of habitat type as long as they have the ability to burrow.

Diet
Tegus are omnivorous. Juvenile tegus in the wild have been observed to eat a wide range of invertebrates including insects, annelids, crustaceans, spiders and snails. They also eat fruits and seeds.  As they mature, their diet becomes more generalized, and plant consumption increases. They may seek out eggs from other reptiles' and from birds' nests and will eat small birds and other vertebrates such as fish, anurans, other lizards, snakes and small mammals (such as rodents). In adulthood, tegus continue to eat insects and wild fruits and it is assumed that such components include desirable or essential nutrients. They also can hunt larger prey such as armadillos

In captivity, tegus commonly are fed high protein diets that include raw or cooked flesh such as ground turkey, canned and dry dog food, commercial crocodile diet, chicken, eggs, insects and small rodents. The inclusion of fruit in the diet is recommended. Though some captive tegus do not readily eat fruit, others enjoy bananas, grapes, mangoes and papayas. However, there is evidence that, as in most husbandry of carnivores, it is good practice to cook most of the egg in the diet, so as to denature the protein avidin that occurs in the albumen. Raw avidin immobilises biotin, so excessive feeding of raw eggs may cause fatal biotin deficiency.

As adults, they have blunted teeth and exaggerated lateral pterygoid muscles which allow them to be generalist feeders. In captivity, they have been observed eating various feeder insects like mealworms, superworms, earthworms, silkworms, crickets and cockroaches, as well as vertebrate prey like mice, rats, fish, turkey (offered in a ground form), rabbit, quail and chicks. Crustaceans such as crayfish are also readily consumed. Like all lizards, blue tegus need a properly balanced diet; incomplete prey items such as insects or ground meat require dusting with a mineral/multi-vitamin supplement. Vitamin deficiencies can lead to trouble shedding skin, lethargy and weight loss; a calcium deficiency can lead to metabolic bone disease, which can be fatal.

Tegus are notorious egg predators which makes them a concerning rising predator of sea turtles, alligators, and crocodiles as their invasive populations spread across the United States.

Tegus will eat anything from plants to hatchlings, but their diet varies by season. Small vertebrate prey is more common in the spring while plant life and invertebrates are more commonly consumed in the summer.

Mortality
Predators of tegus include cougars, jaguars, otters, snakes, caimans, and birds of prey. A known predator of the Argentine black and white tegu is the lesser grison (Galictis cuja), a mustelid related to weasels. Salmonella enterica was found in fecal samples from almost all S. merianae at a captive breeding field station at State University of Santa Cruz, Ilhéus, Bahia state, Brazil illustrating the prevalence of salmonella infection in tegu lizards.

Life cycle
Argentine black and white tegu lizards are typically born at the beginning of spring. When they hatch they are about ten grams and grow up to eight kilograms within four or five years, experiencing a nearly eight-hundred-fold increase in body size. During this time their diet changes from insects to small vertebrates, eggs, carrion, and fruits. They are reproductively mature by their third year (when they are around 1.5 kilograms), and cease their growth by around their fourth year with the highest growth rate being their first and second years of life. Tegu lizards also experience a seasonal circadian life cycle that begins within their first year, being very active during hotter months and in a hibernative state in the colder months. However, regardless of the season the Argentine tegu does not experience any significant fluctuations in metabolism or body mass, which means their sensitivity to temperature underlying their metabolic rate does not change body mass. This differs from other endotherms and further explains the tegu's alternating endothermic and ectothermic behavior.

Brain vesicles (constructed from two neural tube constrictions) that make up the anterior forebrain, midbrain, and posterior hindbrain are developed and distinguishable from day three of embryonic development. On day four, visceral arches (consisting of mesenchymal tissue condensation and separated by grooves) form and are fully grown and fused by day nine. Day four also marks the development of limbs as small swellings. Its hindlimb development (developing claws faster than the forelimb) is more similar to crocodile or turtle embryonic development than other lizards. This alludes to the hindlimbs having greater functionality in tegu adults. Pigmentation is the last morphological structure to form and occurs late in development after other distinguishing characteristics have already been formed (such as scales). Pigmentation is observed from day thirty-nine first on the dorsal portion of the head and body. It later extends down to the proximal and distal portions of the limbs by day forty-five and extends down to the flanks by day forty-eight. As development advances, the pattern begins to show lateral stretch marks by day fifty-one. Pigmentation of the ventral portion of the body occurs between days fifty-seven and sixty, characterized by individualized spot patterns. Paired genital tubercles manifest in both sexes (called hemipenes in males). Reptile embryo development involves separate processes of differentiation and embryo growth. Differentiation is determined by external morphological features and is documented early. As the embryo approaches hatching, development stages are categorized into periods rather than ages (characterized by parameters of development speed).

Behavior

Aggression
Aggression is a vital facet to animal behavior as it provides advantages to survival when resources are limited. For the Argentine tegu, the physical performance of their aggressive behavior (i.e. biting) tends to be hindered by their large size. Regardless of sex, tegus with higher bite force are more aggressive to potential threats. Those with a higher bite force also exhibit less escape responses and tend to be slower, displaying a trade off of fight or flight abilities, but also have the advantage of minimizing risk of energy by reducing the threshold for engagement in an aggressive encounter. This fight or flight trade off is more commonly observed in mammals rather than reptiles, and may be present in tegus because of an increase in head mass (correlated to stronger biting behavior) that makes it difficult to maneuver quickly. In their home territory, Argentine tegus are generally less aggressive (less likely to display arching behavior) and are less likely to attempt escape regardless of size or bite force.

Reproduction
Squamate reptiles like snakes and lizards tend to rely on chemical cues to search for potential mates in their environments. The Argentine black and white tegu exhibits similar behavior, such as a marked "pausing and turning" as they trail in the spring. In particular, female tegus exhibit stronger trailing behavior than males, following scent trails more intensely and expressing a more sensitive response to mating-specific chemical odors. They also exhibit more decisive behavior, demonstrating a common vertebrate trend of female reproduction being the defining factor in influencing population size. Knowledge of this behavior is currently being explored as a strategic avenue to inhibit the current rise of the tegu as an invasive species. Prioritizing the removal of female tegus from the environment can potentially be a more effective way to curb these invasive populations. Tegus are a burrowing species in both their native and invasive habitats, especially during the winter. They mate during the spring after hibernating when their mating hormones are at their peak. During the spring, male Argentine tegus exhibit scent-marking behaviors such as delineating territory with gland scents.

Blue tegus, like other tegus, may breed up to twice a year. They only lay between 18 and 25 eggs in a clutch, sometimes more dependent upon animal size and husbandry as well as the individual health of the gravid female. 

During maternal seasons, female Argentine black and white tegus build nests out of dry grass, small branches, and leaves in order to maintain optimal temperature and humidity levels. Egg incubation lasts for an average of sixty-four days, with a range of forty to seventy-five days depending on incubation temperature and other extenuating factors.

Physiology

Invasive advantage
Physiologically, tegus possess traits that correlate well with their extreme success as an invasive species. Notably, they mature early, reproduce annually, have large clutch sizes, and a relatively long life span compared to other competing species. Out of the Teiidae family, tegus tend to grow to the largest body sizes (around five kilograms). Tegus are also omnivorous and consume everything from fruits, invertebrates, small vertebrates, eggs, and carrion. Their large dietary breadth also contributes to their high survival rate outside of their native habitat. Tegus are active on a seasonal schedule. They avoid dangerously cold or dry climates by hibernating underground. Additionally, they are capable of utilizing endothermy to elevate their body temperatures in response to their environment.

Endothermic behavior
Tegus in their native environment spend most of the colder months hibernating in their burrows without feeding but emerge in the spring for their mating season. While hibernating, their metabolism generates heat that maintains their temperature a few degrees above the burrow temperature, marking them as partial endotherms. This self-reliant endothermic behavior continues into the reproductive season. However, Argentine tegus only display this behavior for part of the year and behave as ectotherms for the rest (sunbathing, temperature reliant on environment). This endothermic behavior is also not a sex-biased evolutionary adaptation for egg production as both males and females indiscriminately exhibit this behavior.

The Argentine tegu experiences significant shifts in metabolism and body temperature by season. They are highly active throughout the day during warmer months (such as participating in reproductive endothermy during the spring) and experience drastic metabolic suppression during the winter.

Salvator merianae has recently been shown to be one of the few partially warm-blooded lizards, having a temperature up to  higher than the ambient temperature at nighttime; however, unlike true endotherms such as mammals and birds, these lizards only display temperature control during their reproductive season (September to December), so are said to possess seasonal reproductive endothermy. Because convergent evolution is one of the strongest lines of evidence for the adaptive significance of a trait, the discovery of reproductive endothermy in this lizard not only complements the long known reproductive endothermy observed in some species of pythons, but also supports the hypothesis that the initial selective benefit for endothermy in birds and mammals was reproductive.

Locomotion
The Argentine black and white tegu is used to study the evolutionary history of shoulder joint locomotive muscles. Because of its weight and heavy girth, it has unique modifications to its skeletal gait that help map the evolutionary history of the non-mammalian musculoskeletal structure.

Interactions with humans and livestock

As household pets
When black and white tegu are kept as pets, they can be fed proteins, fruits, and vegetables. Some examples of proteins that they can be fed are live bugs such as meal and horn worms, dubia roaches, and crickets. Other sources of protein include canned insects, scrambled or hard boiled eggs, snails, ducklings, chicks, boiled organ meats, shrimp, mice, or rats that are either alive or have been previously frozen and then thawed. The black and white tegu may be fed fruits and vegetables as well. For example, they can be fed berries such as strawberries, raspberries, and blueberries. They can also be fed bananas, apples, kiwis, pears, pumpkins, melons, peas, squash, apricots, mangos, figs, papaya, cantaloupe, and grapes.

Blue tegu

The blue tegu is a variant known for its light blue coloration, which is most intense and vivid in the adult males. Even immature animals can be easily distinguished from other mostly black and white tegus by the "singe mark" on their nose. They are among the more suitable tegus for pets and can be easily tamed but, in the wild, will either try to run away or react aggressively if provoked. There is much controversy about the correct scientific classification of this animal. Large-scale taxon sampling of the teiids has not led to any strong resolutions based on morphological and genetic data; the majority of data about the blue tegu comes from hobbyists. Some believe it is a mutation of the Argentine black and white tegu, while others, including the original importer, believe it is sufficiently different to have its own classification. The first blue tegu to be exported from South America was in a wholesale shipment of tegus from Colombia.

The coloring of a blue tegu can range from a simple black and white color to albino to powder blue to even "platinum", which is basically a high white color morph. The colouration does not tend to appear until the animal reaches sexual maturity around the age of 18 months or it reaches  or more in size. Just like the Argentine black and white tegu, the blue tegu has a very quick growth rate, almost reaching 75% of its full length in 1 year. Size is relative to genetics as well as husbandry and diet.

Captive husbandry
To accommodate their size, a lone adult should be housed in nothing smaller than a  ×  ×  size cage, with the largest floor size possible. A pair of adults need double that size. They must have a lot of floor space. About six inches of substrate should be used to allow for burrowing, as well as a substrate that holds humidity well. Most owners use cypress mulch mixed with coconut fiber, as it retains humidity extremely well and is commercially available. Use only organic substrates, as anything with pesticides or additives, much like what you would commonly find at a hardware store, will cause many health issues with your tegu, including death. A good UVA and UVB bulb is imperative to keeping a tegu in good health. They need UVB to produce Vitamin D in their bodies, as well as metabolizing calcium. If they are not allowed exposure to UVB on a daily basis, they can experience severe pain and/or deformities from diseases such as metabolic bone disease. Along with UVB, a blue tegu also needs a temperature gradient. This means that one side of the cage must be cooler, while the other is much warmer and provides a basking spot. This is so they can regulate their body temperature by going to whatever temperature works for them at the moment. They also need the surface of their basking spot to meet specific temperature requirements. For healthy shedding, a humidity of 60-80% is preferred. 

Like most lizards, fresh water should be provided daily. Like other tegu species, you should make sure your Argentine black and white tegu has enough water to soak in if they wish. Never allow the water level to be above shoulder height for a tegu, as many tegus commonly drown when left without supervision.

Legality
On May 28, 2021 the South Carolina Department of Natural Resources banned importation and breeding, and requires registration of black and white tegus already in South Carolina.

As food 
S. merianae - like a lot of animals used for bushmeat - is a common food source for humans in its native range and could be an economically and dietarily beneficial meat source if used more widely.

Leather trade
The Argentine black and white tegu has long been hunted for their skins to supply the international leather trade. They are one of the most exploited reptile species in the world, but trade is legal in most South American countries. It is not an endangered species and overharvesting has not as of yet been monitored.

Invasive species
Argentine black and white tegus have also escaped from the pet trade in Florida and are now an invasive species in Florida, Georgia and South Carolina. The first sighting of S. merianae in Berkeley County, South Carolina was on September 10, 2020. Eight total sightings in South Carolina have been recorded as of September 10, 2020.

The Argentine Black and White Tegu has been a particular threat to native wildlife like birds and reptiles that build nests or burrows on the ground. Notably, they exhibit a particular type of both predatory and competitive behavior known as intraguild predation. Argentine tegus will pursue and kill but not eat other native reptiles, which worsens their invasive effect on wildlife. Efforts such as placing traps or localized hunting have been largely unsuccessful in eradicating their egregious effect on non-native environments.

Because of their invasive threat to native and imperiled species, population containment initiatives have been a priority in the past ten years, leading to the extraction of nearly 3,300 tegus from Miami-Dade County alone. Unfortunately such efforts have been difficult. Historically, tegus have survived brutalizing harvests amid the leather trade, marking them a remarkably resilient species.

As of April 29, 2021, residents of Florida are now legally allowed to kill these invasive Argentine Black and White Tegus that are spotted on private properties with the landowners' permission, and on the public lands of Florida. The barriers that were protecting these non native reptiles have been removed to prevent the population of tegus from increasing in Florida. As an alternative to killing them, the Florida Fish and Wildlife Conservation Commission (FWC) staff offer to take control and maintain this species by capturing and removing tegus from this environment.

Taxonomy

In 1839, this species of tegu was originally described as Salvator merianae.  However, beginning in 1845 and continuing for 154 years, it was confused with Tupinambis teguixin and was considered a synonym of that species. In 1995, it was again given species status as Tupinambis merianae because subsequent studies had shown that the gold tegu (Tupinambis teguixin) was distinct from it. In 2012, the Argentine black and white tegu was reassigned to the resurrected genus Salvator as Salvator merianae.

S. merianae is called the "Argentine black and white tegu" to distinguish it from the "Colombian black and white tegu", which is another name for the gold tegu. Unscrupulous or incompetent pet dealers sometimes pass off gold tegus as Argentine black and white tegus. 

S. merianae and T. teguixin can be distinguished by skin texture and scale count:

S. merianae has two loreal scales between the eye and the nostril.
T. teguixin has only one loreal scale between the eye and the nostril.

In the ecotone between the arid Chaco and the Espinal of central Argentina, they are known to naturally hybridise with the red tegu (Salvator rufescens) with a stable hybrid zone.

See also
Gold tegu
Tegu
Teius
Teius teyou

References

External links
 
 
 Care for Argentine Black and White Tegus - PetsWithScales.com

Further reading
 

Salvator (lizard)
Reptiles described in 1839
Reptiles of Argentina
Reptiles of Bolivia
Reptiles of Brazil
Reptiles of Paraguay
Taxa named by André Marie Constant Duméril
Taxa named by Gabriel Bibron
Reptiles as pets